Gull Wing Bridge is a road bridge being built to span Lake Lothing in the town of Lowestoft, Suffolk, England, which is claimed to be (once completed) the largest rolling bascule bridge in the world lifted using hydraulic cylinders.

The bridge will be higher than the existing bascule bridge at the harbour mouth, and so will not need to be lifted up as often for shipping to pass underneath. The idea of a third bridge in the area was first suggested in 1918, and approval for the Lake Lothing Third Crossing was granted in 2020. It was renamed Gull Wing Bridge after a competition for names being held at local schools.

History
The lifting Bridge at the eastern end of Lake Lothing in Lowestoft, Suffolk, England, is raised several times a day to allow boats access and egress to the harbour, and the North Sea. This hampers the traffic system meaning it can take an hour to drive from the south side of town, to the north side. It has been estimated that the lifting bascule bridge carries 14,000 vehicles a day. A third crossing was first mooted in 1918, just after the First World War ended. A total of three moving bridges have been built at the eastern end of Lake Lothing where the water falls into the North Sea; the current bascule lifting bridge was installed in 1972.

The approval to build the £94 million Gull Wing Bridge was granted in April 2020, but by August of 2020, costs had risen to £148 million through delays, the Covid-19 pandemic, and a desire to have a contingency fund "...should any unforeseen issues arise and caters for any further complications caused by coronavirus".

Gull Wing Bridge
The preparatory works for the bridge started in January 2021, with the official groundbreaking on 22 March 2021, after an unexploded ordnance survey was undertaken in the strectch of water beneath the bridge's location. The bridge will straddle the inner harbour, and connect Denmark Road and Peto Way on the north bank, with Waveney Drive on the south bank. Originally tendered to BAM Nuttall, the contract to build the bridge fell through and was re-tendered to Farrans.

Road Access to the bridge from the south will be along the B1351 (Waveney Drive), which has access to the A1117 road in the west, and the A12 road in the east. On the northern side, the road will access the A12 road, and the A47 road, as well as the A1114 road through either Denmark Road or Peto Way. The design of the bridge includes a foot and cycle path on both sides, with a single-lane of traffic in each direction (north/south).

The height of the bridge above high water will be , and at the northern end will have a  clearance above the railway line into  station. The Gull Wing Bridge will be at a greater height above the water level than the existing bascule bridge at the eastern end of Lake Lothing; because of this, it is hoped the bridge will not be needed to be raised as many times per day, thereby causing less disruption to traffic. The design calls for a lifting section in the middle, which will raise southwards to allow ships to pass underneath. A traffic assessment indicated that approximately 10,000 vessels will need to go past the point of the bridge (10% less than the bascule bridge at the harbour mouth), but that the bridge will only need to be raised for 25% of the traffic passing.

The name of the bridge was decided upon after a local schools competition, and pupils from Somerleyton Primary School described the style of the bascule bridge posts looking like a gull's wings.

Construction 
February 2021 - Preparation works began

April 2021 - Construction began

June 2021 - Land piling works began

July 2021 - Marine piling works began

May 2022 - Colin Law Way access road opened

August 2022 - Piling for the bridge piers complete

October 2022 - Installation of first steel deck section (NAV1)

January 2023 - Completion of Waveney Drive Roundabout

January 2023 Onwards - Construction of the southern approach embankment; construction of the control tower

March 2023 onwards - Construction of northern roundabout/approach roads

Spring 2023 - Planned Completion of abutments/piers

Spring 2023 Onwards - Arrival/Installation of Steel Deck Sections 

September 2023 - Planned completion of the Northern Roundabout/approach roads 

December 2023 - Bridge Opens

Reclassification of Roads 
The new bridge will become part of the A12 road. Plans include reclassifying several other A and B roads to reflect the new primary route through the town.  

 B1531 (Waveney Drive from Tom Crisp Roundabout to the new Gull Wing Southern Roundabout) will become part of the A12
 The Gull Wing Bridge and associated approach ramps will be designated part of the A12
 Peto Way will become part of the A12
 The A1117 (Peto Way & Millennium Way) will become part of the A12

Other classification changes include the A1117 (Normanston Drive, Bridge, Road and Saltwater Way) becoming part of the A146.

References

Sources

External links
Bridge website

Lowestoft
Bridges in Suffolk